Castelletto Monferrato is a comune (municipality) in the Province of Alessandria in the Italian region Piedmont, located about  east of Turin and about  northwest of Alessandria.

The municipality of Castelletto Monferrato contains the frazioni (subdivisions, mainly villages and hamlets) Giardinetto and Gerlotti.

Castelletto Monferrato borders the following municipalities: Alessandria, Quargnento, and San Salvatore Monferrato.

References

Cities and towns in Piedmont